Claude Monet Painting in His Garden at Argenteuil is an 1873 Impressionist painting by Pierre-Auguste Renoir.

See also
 The Improvised Field Hospital, 1865 painting by Frédéric Bazille
 A Studio at Les Batignolles, 1870 painting by Henri Fantin-Latour
 Claude Monet Painting in his Studio, 1874 painting by Édouard Manet
 Portrait of the painter Claude Monet, 1875 painting by Renoir

References

Argenteuil
Paintings by Pierre-Auguste Renoir
1873 paintings
Cultural depictions of Claude Monet
Paintings about painting
Paintings in the Wadsworth Atheneum